Jean Daurand (1913–1989) was a French actor. He starred in La Nuit Merveilleuse and Derrière la Facade.

Selected filmography

 Rothchild (1933)
 Le secret d'une nuit (1934)
 Pension Mimosas (1935) - Un groom (uncredited)
 Passé à vendre (1936)
 Les grands (1936)
 Nitchevo (1936) - Un matelot
 Les petites alliées (1936) - Un marin
 The Man of the Hour (1937) - Un journaliste (uncredited)
 Double crime sur la ligne Maginot (1937)
 Hercule (1938) - Sandwich (uncredited)
 Alert in the Mediterranean (1938) - Le matelot Calas
 Éducation de prince (1938) - Le camarade de Marianne
 Le capitaine Benoît (1938) - Griffon
 Behind the Facade (1939) - Le télégraphiste
 Nord-Atlantique (1939) - Gus
 Latin Quarter (1939) - L'Ablette
 Brazza ou l'épopée du Congo (1940) - Le quartier-maître Hamon
 Sixième étage (1940) - Jojo - le jeune ouvrier
 The Marvelous Night (1940) - Le mari
 La vie est magnifique (1940) - Maurice
 Chambre 13 (1942) - Le chasseur
 Men Without Fear (1942) - Joseph
 Huit hommes dans un château (1942) - L'acrobate
 Les petits riens (1942)
 Après l'orage (1943) - Paul Cerdan
 Port d'attache (1943) - Marius
 Picpus (1943) - Le coursier (uncredited)
 Départ à zéro (1943) - Coco
 Strange Inheritance (1943) - Un marin (uncredited)
 Love Around the Clock (1943) - L'ouvrier
 Night Shift (1944) - René Favier
 L'enfant de l'amour (1944) - Georges
 The Battle of the Rails (1946) - Cheminot
 The Misfortunes of Sophie (1946) - Antoine Blaise
 Son of France (1946) - Le maréchal des logis Gobert
 Man About Town (1947) - Alfred - un machiniste
 Les jeux sont faits (1947) - Paulo
 Les amours de Blanche Neige (1947)
 Quai des Orfèvres (1947) - L'inspecteur Picard
 The Cupboard Was Bare (1948) - Le jeune marié
 Les dieux du dimanche (1949) - Charles Lambert
 Le paradis des pilotes perdus (1949) - Andrali
 Dakota 308 (1951) - Le radio
 La vie est un jeu (1951)
 My Wife, My Cow and Me (1952)
 Allô... je t'aime (1952) - Le contremaître
 We Are All Murderers (1952) - Girard, l'homme dans la cabine téléphonique
 Beauties of the Night (1952) - Un révolutionnaire (uncredited)
 Ils sont dans les vignes... (1952) - Le deuxième copain
 La fugue de Monsieur Perle (1952) - Le laveur de carreaux de l'hôpital psychiatrique
 The Tour of the Grand Dukes (1953) - Un dragueur au 'Balajo'
 Touchez pas au grisbi (1954) - Un consommateur chez Bouche (uncredited)
 Crime au Concert Mayol (1954) - Bill
 Huis clos (1954) - Un soldat (uncredited)
 Black Dossier (1955) - Le titi
 People of No Importance (1956) - Un infirmier
 If All the Guys in the World (1956) - Yves
 Gervaise (1956) - Un ouvrier (uncredited)
 Escapade (1957) - L'inspecteur
 L'inspecteur aime la bagarre (1957) - Un gangster
 Paris Holiday (1958) - (uncredited)
 Police judiciaire (1958) - L'interpellé interdit de séjour
 A Certain Monsieur Jo (1958) - Le cafetier
 Prisons de femmes (1958)
 In Case of Adversity (1958) - Un inspecteur (uncredited)
 Time Bomb (1959) - Pepere
 Un témoin dans la ville (1959) - Bernard - un habitué du café
 Quai du Point-du-Jour (1960)
 Le Sahara brûle (1961) - Bouthier
 Les livreurs (1961) - Bourdier
 In the Affirmative (1964) - Le patron du relais routier 
 L'assassin viendra ce soir (1964) - L'adjoint de Serval
 The Curse of Belphegor (1967) - Lefèvre

References

External links

1913 births
1989 deaths
Male actors from Paris
French male film actors
French male stage actors
French male television actors
20th-century French male actors